Zelazo may refer to:

Places
Żelazo, Łódź Voivodeship, a village in central Poland
Żelazo, Pomeranian Voivodeship, a village in northern Poland

Other
Zelazo (surname)
Żelazo (PKP station), a non-operational railway station in Poland
Helene Zelazo Center for the Performing Arts, at the University of Wisconsin–Milwaukee

See also